Darko Dunjić (Serbian Cyrillic: Дарко Дуњић; born 8 February 1981) is a Serbian former professional footballer who played as a defender.

External links
 Official player site
 soccerterminal
 
 Profile and stats until 2003 in SCG League website

1981 births
Living people
Sportspeople from Kraljevo
Serbian footballers
Association football defenders
FK Sloga Kraljevo players
Red Star Belgrade footballers
FK Spartak Subotica players
FC Kryvbas Kryvyi Rih players
FC Zorya Luhansk players
SC Bastia players
Ukrainian Premier League players
Serbian expatriate footballers
Serbian expatriate sportspeople in France
Expatriate footballers in France
Serbian expatriate sportspeople in Ukraine
Expatriate footballers in Ukraine